Nobuyuki Hatta (born 6 November 1944) is a Japanese weightlifter. He competed in the men's lightweight event at the 1968 Summer Olympics.

References

1944 births
Living people
Japanese male weightlifters
Olympic weightlifters of Japan
Weightlifters at the 1968 Summer Olympics
Sportspeople from Hokkaido
Asian Games medalists in weightlifting
Asian Games gold medalists for Japan
Weightlifters at the 1970 Asian Games
Medalists at the 1970 Asian Games
20th-century Japanese people
21st-century Japanese people